Albany Creek Excelsior Football Club is an Australian football (soccer) club from Albany Creek, a suburb of Brisbane, Queensland, Australia.  The club was formed in 1963, and currently play in Brisbane Premier League.

History
Albany Creek Excelsior was founded in 1963 by Hec Wolter, the headmaster of Albany Creek Primary School. The early years of the club focussed on providing teams for Brisbane's junior soccer competitions, with an emphasis on the development of local junior players.

The club is first recorded as competing in senior competition in 1977 when it played in Brisbane's Division Seven. The club slowly rose up the ranks and was promoted to Division Two after winning the 1995 Division Three Grand Final against Capalaba. For the next 14 seasons from 1996 to 2009, Albany Creek Excelsior remained at the second tier of Brisbane competition, just one level below the Brisbane Premier League.

In 2007, Albany Creek Excelsior was the largest football club on Brisbane's northside with 63 junior teams, 5 senior squads and over 760 male and female players spanning the junior and senior ranks.

After relegation in 2009, a season when the club failed to win a game, Albany Creek Excelsior bounced back and narrowly missed promotion in 2010 Premier League Two, and achieved the best cup run in their history by reaching the semi-finals of the 2010 Brisbane Premier Cup before being knocked out by Rochedale Rovers.

Between 2007 and 2011, the club was able to invest heavily in infrastructure at Wolter Park and the South Pine Sports Complex, thanks to generous donations from supporters of the club together with government financial support. These investments contributed to the club being promoted to the Brisbane Premier League for the first time in 2013, and its associated club Moreton Bay United FC being selected into the National Premier Leagues Queensland.

Albany Creek secured their first Brisbane Premier League Premiership in 2018. They would fall short of the Championship to Grange Thistle losing 5–1 in the grand final. In  2019, Albany Creek would complete the double winning both the Brisbane Premier League Premiership with 52 points and the Championship beating Toowong FC 2–0 in the grand final. In 2022, Albany Creek were promoted to FQPL 2 after winning the 2021 FQPL 3 - Metro Premiership.

Current squad

Youth

Players from the U23s who have been featured in a first-team matchday squad for ACE in a competitive match

Recent Seasons

Source:

* Shortened season due to COVID-19 pandemic  
The tier is the level in the Australian soccer league system

Honours

FQPL 3 − Metro / Brisbane Premier League 
 Premiership
Winners (3): 2018, 2019, 2021
 Championship
Winners (1):  2019
Brisbane Premier Division 1 
 Premiership
Winners (1): 2012
Brisbane Premier Division 2 
 Championship
Winners (1): 2011
Brisbane Division 1 North 
 Championship
Winners (1): 1998
Brisbane Division 3 
 Championship
Winners (1): 1995
Brisbane Division 4 
 Premiership
Winners (1): 1990

References

External links
 

Soccer clubs in Brisbane
Brisbane Premier League teams
Association football clubs established in 1963
1963 establishments in Australia